Skarżysko-Kamienna  is a city in northern Świętokrzyskie Voivodeship in south-central Poland by Kamienna river, to the north of Świętokrzyskie Mountains; one of the voivodship's major cities. Prior to 1928, it bore the name of Kamienna; in less formal contexts usually only the first part of the name (Skarżysko) is used. It belongs to historic Polish province of Lesser Poland.

Skarżysko-Kamienna is an important railroad junction, with two main lines (Kraków – Warsaw and Sandomierz – Koluszki) crossing there.

History
The present-day districts of Łyżwy and Nowy Młyn were the locations of Paleolithic industrial settlements, which are now archaeological sites, part of the Rydno Archaeological Reserve, consisting of several hundred former Paleolithic sites stretching from Skarżysko-Kamienna to Wąchock. The sites were discovered in 1923–1925.

In 1173, the knights' congress gathered in Milica village (now the town's district) led by Casimir II The Just. Within the Polish Kingdom, Skarżysko was a private village of Polish nobility, administratively located in the Radom County in the Sandomierz Voivodeship in the Lesser Poland Province of the Polish Crown. Around 1885 Kamienna became an important rail junction on the newly built Ivangorod-Dąbrowa Railway.  The main line of the railway connecting Ivangorod (Dęblin) and Dąbrowa Górnicza ran through the town from north to south, and two branch lines to Ostrowiec Świętokrzyski and Koluszki radiated from the town east and west, respectively. This spurred the growth of Kamienna from a village into a sizeable town by 1920, when it had about 20 enterprises employing 1000 workers, as well as railway workshops employing an additional 1000 workers.

Second Polish Republic
In 1923, the commune of Kamienna was granted the status of a town. In 1922 the government of Poland decided to build an ammunition factory in Kamienna, to be called Państwowa Wytwornia Uzbrojenia Fabryka Amunicji (P.W.U. Fabryka Amunicji, "National Armament Factory - Ammunition Plant")   It began production in 1924 supplying munitions to the Polish Army. It employed 2760 workers in 1932, over 3000 in 1936, and over 4500 in 1939, becoming the principal employer in the town and driving its growth. The company still functions today under the name Zakłady Metalowe MESKO S.A.).

In 1928, town's name was changed to Skarżysko-Kamienna. In 1937 the town had 19,700 inhabitants, among them 2,800 Jews (about 14% of the total).

German occupation of Skarżysko-Kamienna (1939–1945)

Following the September 1939 invasion of Poland by Germany, which started World War II, Skarżysko-Kamienna was under German occupation until liberated by the Soviet army in January 1945. The Germans controlled the ammunition factory to support their own war effort, and from 1940 it was controlled by the company Hugo Schneider Aktiengesellschaft (HASAG), which ran it as a subcontractor for the Wehrmacht. In 1940, the Germans carried out mass executions of Poles (360 people executed in February and 760 in June). The Polish underground resistance organization Orzeł Biały ("White Eagle") was organized in the town. Among its members were local monks, and a weapons depot used by Polish partisans was located in the local monastery. Several monks were arrested and murdered by the Germans in the massacre committed in February 1940, while one managed to escape arrest.

The ghetto for the town's Jewish population was established by the Germans in April or May 1941.  Between August 1942 and summer of 1943 Jews from the Radom district were brought to three camps near the munitions factory to work the factory.  According to German records, of the total 17,210 brought in with 58 transports, 6,408 managed to survive long enough to be evacuated to other camps when the Germans closed the factory in 1944. The ghetto was liquidated in October 1942, with some inhabitants judged fit for work moved to the factory labour camps (about 500 out of 3000), and the rest were transported to Treblinka.  In the major monograph on the subject estimated that despite the incompleteness of German records which likely underestimate the number of inmates, about 25,000 Jewish inmates were brought to the camp and 7,000 were evacuated from it; about 18,000 died there. The secret Polish Council to Aid Jews "Żegota", established by the Polish resistance movement, operated in the town. There are several known cases of Poles, who were either executed on sight or imprisoned in the local prison and deported to concentration camps for rescuing and aiding Jews.

At least nine boy scouts and two girls scouts from the town were murdered by the Germans during the occupation (see Nazi crimes against the Polish nation). The monk who managed to avoid capture by the Germans in 1940, died in the Soviet bombing of the town in 1945.

From 1945 to present
On January 18, 1945 the town was liberated and restored to Poland, although with a Soviet-installed communist regime, which remained in power until the Fall of Communism in the 1980s. About a dozen Jewish survivors returned to Skarżysko-Kamienna in the winter of 1945-1946 to retrieve Jewish property. Soon afterwards, in February 1946, five of them were murdered for profit by a small group of local criminals.  The murderers, among them the head of the Soviet-installed town police and another communist policeman, were put on trial in Łodź. Three of them received the death penalty. The remaining Jews left Poland, except for Dr. Zundel Kahanel and his wife Bima who spent the rest of their lives in the city.

Meanwhile, in 1948 the leading HASAG managers were tried in Leipzig, then in the part of Germany occupied by the Soviet Union. Of the 25 tried, 4 were sentenced to death, 2 to life in prison, and 18 to terms between one and five years.

In 1969, The White Eagle Museum was established. In 1984, town limits were expanded by including the neighboring settlements of Łyżwy and Nowy Młyn as new districts. In 1999, Skarżysko County was established as a result of the Local Government Reorganization Act (1998).

Mayors 
 Jan Zbroja 1918
 Antoni Biernacki 1918–1923
 Tadeusz Miażdżyński 1924–1925
 Wawrzyniec Ergietowski 1925–1928
 Konstanty Bobowski ?–1934
 Franciszek Tatkowski 1934

Points of interest
 The White Eagle Museum (Polish: Muzeum im. Orła Białego) - a regional museum with a large outdoor display of military equipment, most items dating back to the World War II period.
 Indoor display – uniforms, ammunition, pistols and smaller guns, soldier equipment, photographs and documents
 Outdoor display – one of Poland's few ships displayed onshore (torpedo boat Odważny - The Brave), planes, tanks (including one of world's few preserved Sturmgeschütz IV vehicles), helicopters, cannons, etc.
 Several scenes of Steven Spielberg's Schindler's List were filmed at MESKO.

Sports
The town's most notable sports clubs are football team ZKS Granat Skarżysko and volleyball team , which both compete in the lower leagues.

Notable people
Daria Pikulik (born 1997), track cyclist
Wiktoria Pikulik (born 1998), racing cyclist
Krzysztof Ratajski (born 1977), professional darts player
Sylwia Spurek (born 1976), politician and lawyer

International relations

Twin towns — Sister cities
Skarżysko-Kamienna is twinned with:
 Stafford
 Zhmerynka
 Kavarna
 Franklin Park, Illinois
 Chicago
 Langfang

References

External links
 skarzysko.pl - official site of the town's municipality 
 

Cities and towns in Świętokrzyskie Voivodeship
Skarzysko Kamienna
Radom Governorate
Kielce Voivodeship (1919–1939)
Prehistoric sites in Poland
Holocaust locations in Poland
Nazi war crimes in Poland